Aleksander Zawadzki, alias Kazik, Wacek, Bronek, One (16 December 1899 – 7 August 1964) was a Polish communist   politician, first Chairman of the Council of State of the People's Republic of Poland, divisional general of the Polish Army and the head of the Council of State of the Polish People's Republic from 1952 until his death in 1964.

Biography 
Son of Wawrzyniec, a steelworker and Marianna née Chojkowska. He was born in the Ksawera working group between Będzin and Dąbrowa Górnicza. Thanks to the relatively good material position of the family, he studied at the local elementary school. As a result of an accident suffered by his father, in 1913 he was forced to stop his education and take up a job. After the outbreak of the First World War, he left for agricultural work in Thuringia. He worked there until 1917, when he was arrested for hitting his overseer and sent to the prisoners of war camp in Erfurt. After escaping from there, he found himself in Upper Silesia, where he worked in a coal mine in Bytom and in the steelworks in Siemianowice Śląskie. After the outbreak of the revolution in November 1918 in Germany, he crossed the German-Polish border and settled in Dąbrowa Górnicza, where in December 1918 he volunteered for the Polish Army. He took part in the battles in defense of Lviv, and then in war activities on the Lithuanian-Belarusian Front of the Polish-Bolshevik war. In 1921 he was demobilized as a non-commissioned officer of the Polish Army, after which he returned to Dąbrowa Górnicza. For participating in the fighting in 1920, he was awarded the Cross of Valor.

After returning from the war, he was initially unemployed, and then he worked at the coal mine "Paris" in Dąbrowa Górnicza. There he also encountered the communist movement and joined the Young Communist League of Poland. In 1923 he became a member of the Communist Party of Poland. During this period he was wanted by state police for communist activities. He operated in the Łódź District until 1924, after which he was sent to a party school in Moscow, where he stayed for several weeks. On July 9, 1925, he was arrested in Vilnius on charges of involvement in a murder of a supposed police informant. In December 1925, despite the lack of evidence for his involvement, he was sentenced to six years in prison. He served his sentence in Kielce, Łomża and Drohobych. He left prison on March 2, 1932, and because of illness, was sent to the USSR for treatment. There he healed and taught at the party school of the WKP (b) and the OGPU near Moscow.

He returned to Poland in 1934. On May 27, 1934, he was arrested in Warsaw. He was detained in custody until February 1935, when he was released on bail. On January 13, 1936, he was arrested again. He was then accused of acting to the detriment of the Republic of Poland. The trial took place on April 4-21, 1938. Along with Zawadzki, who was the main accused, 55 other people were tried. Zawadzki was sentenced to 15 years imprisonment. After upholding the judgment of November 23, 1938 by the Court of Appeals, he was imprisoned in Brest. He stayed there until September 1939, when after the aggression of the USSR to Poland, the city was occupied by the Red Army. He took up work in the Byelorussian Soviet Socialist Republic in the Pinsk district office.

Aleksander Zawadzki was elected to the Sejm in 1947, and on 20 November 1952 he was appointed chairman of the Polish Council of State, to replace Bolesław Bierut. 

Zawadzki died on 7 August, 1964 of cancer at the age of 64.

Honours and awards
 Knight's Cross of the Virtuti Militari
 Grand Cross of the Order of Polonia Restituta
 Order of the Builders of People's Poland
 Order of the Banner of Labour, 1st Class
 Cross of Grunwald, 2nd Class
 Cross of Valour (1920)
 Partisan Cross (12 June 1946)
 Silesian Insurrectionary Cross

References 

1899 births
1964 deaths
People from Dąbrowa Górnicza
People from Piotrków Governorate
Communist Party of Poland politicians
Polish Workers' Party politicians
Members of the Politburo of the Polish United Workers' Party
Heads of state of the Polish People's Republic
Members of the State National Council
Members of the Polish Sejm 1947–1952
Members of the Polish Sejm 1952–1956
Members of the Polish Sejm 1957–1961
Members of the Polish Sejm 1961–1965
Byelorussian Soviet Socialist Republic people
Polish people of the Polish–Ukrainian War
Polish people of the Polish–Soviet War
Recipients of the Virtuti Militari (1943–1989)
Knights of the Virtuti Militari
Grand Crosses of the Order of Polonia Restituta
Recipients of the Order of the Builders of People's Poland
Recipients of the Order of the Banner of Work
Recipients of the Order of the Cross of Grunwald, 2nd class
Recipients of the Cross of Valour (Poland)